Robert Sewell (1751 – 30 April 1828) was a British politician and colonial official who sat in the Parliament of Great Britain from 1796 to 1802 and served as the Attorney General of Jamaica.

Sewell was the son of Sir Thomas Sewell and Catherine Heath of Ottershaw Park, Surrey and christened 13 December 1751 at All Hallows, London. He studied law at the Middle Temple and was called to the bar in 1770.

He married Sarah Lewis in St Pancras, London on 18 November 1775. In February 1776 they set sail for Jamaica on board the Judith and Hilaria from Portsmouth with Sarah's sisters Mary, Maria and Catherine. In 1780 he was appointed as the Attorney General of Jamaica, returning in 1795 to become a colonial agent for Jamaica.

In 1781 he fathered an illegitimate son with a local black woman. This son was the future-revolutionary  William Davidson.

He became Member of Parliament for Grampound from 1796 to 1802 and spoke in the House of Commons on behalf of the West Indian Planters interest. In May 1797, he argued that it would be economically impossible to abolish slavery. In April and May 1798 he spoke against the abolitionist William Smith's proposal to provide minimum level of space for enslaved Africans on slave ships.

He was an uncle of "Monk" Lewis. He also brought up  William Henry, who adopted the name William Henry Sewell and became a general in the British Army.

References

1751 births
1828 deaths
People from Ottershaw
Members of the Middle Temple
Attorneys General of the Colony of Jamaica
Members of the Parliament of Great Britain for constituencies in Cornwall
British MPs 1796–1800
Members of the Parliament of the United Kingdom for constituencies in Cornwall
UK MPs 1801–1802